Tanguturi (Telugu: టంగుటూరి) is one of the Indian surnames.
 Tanguturi Prakasam, was an Indian politician and Chief Minister. 
 Tanguturi Anjaiah, was the Chief Minister of Andhra Pradesh, India. 
 Tanguturi Suryakumari, famous Telugu actress and singer.
 Tanguturi Manemma, Parliament member from Musheerabad Lok Sabha constituency.

Indian surnames